Saulo Araújo Fontes or simply Saulo (born April 2, 1989 in Piranhas), is a Brazilian goalkeeper. He currently plays for Moto Club.

Saulo scored a last minute winner against Vitória-PE in February 2011, during a Campeonato Pernambucano match, his first ever professional goal. He injured himself while celebrating and was sidelined for six months with tore knee ligaments.

Honours
Sport
Campeonato Pernambucano: 2010
Copa do Nordeste: 2014
ABC
Copa RN: 2015

References

External links

CBF 

1989 births
Living people
Brazilian footballers
Brazil youth international footballers
Brazil under-20 international footballers
Campeonato Brasileiro Série A players
Campeonato Brasileiro Série B players
Campeonato Brasileiro Série C players
Sport Club do Recife players
ABC Futebol Clube players
Treze Futebol Clube players
Moto Club de São Luís players
Sertãozinho Futebol Clube players
Vila Nova Futebol Clube players
Association football goalkeepers